How to Console Widows is a 1976 Brazilian film directed by José Mojica Marins. Marins is best known for the Zé do Caixão (Coffin Joe) film series. In this film Marins is credited as J. Avelar.

Plot

A bankrupt playboy makes a plan to obtain money. He reads in the news about the death of three wealthy married rich men who die in a plane crash. Disguised as a ghost, that night he visits the three widows. Scared, they not only give him money, but also consent to having sex with him.

When the three women become pregnant, the father hires a priest to exorcise the little ghosts from them.

Cast
 Vic Barone
 Zélia Diniz
 Vosmarline Siqueira
 Lourênia Machado
 Walter Portela
 Vick Militello
 Chaguinha
 João Paulo Ramalho
 Helena Samara
 René Mauro
 José Carvalho
 David Húngaro

References

External links
Official film site 

Como Consolar Vuívas at Portal Heco de Brasil 

1976 comedy films
1976 films
Brazilian comedy films
Films directed by José Mojica Marins
1970s Portuguese-language films